The 2018 Kyrgyzstan Cup is the 27th season of the Kyrgyzstan Cup knockout tournament. The cup winner qualifies for the 2019 AFC Cup.

The draw of the tournament was held on 4 May 2018.

First round

Zone A

Matches
The first round draw was made as follows:

Second round

Zone A

Matches
The first round draw was made as follows:

Zone B

Matches
The first round draw was made as follows:

Round of 16

Matches

Quarter-finals

Matches

Semi-finals

First leg

Second leg

Final

See also
2018 Kyrgyzstan League

External links

Kyrgyzstan Cup News
Kyrgyzstan Cup Results
Kyrgyzstan Cup 2018, RSSSF.com

References

Kyrgyzstan Cup seasons
Kyrgyzstan
Kyrgyzstan Cup